Watch the Sound with Mark Ronson is an American documentary series created by Morgan Neville, and hosted by Mark Ronson. The series premiered on Apple TV+ on July 30, 2021.

The series was not renewed for a second season.

Episodes

Production
On April 13, 2021, it was announced that Apple TV+ had picked up a six-part documentary series hosted by Mark Ronson. In the series, Ronson will "examine sound creation and revolutionary technology used to shape music, [...] and the lengths producers and creators are willing to go to find the perfect sound".

The series is executive produced by Ronson, Morgan Neville for Tremolo Productions, Mark Monroe, Jason Zeldes and Kim Rozenfeld.

References

External links
 Watch the Sound with Mark Ronson on Apple TV+
 

2020s American documentary television series
2021 American television series debuts
2021 American television series endings
English-language television shows
Apple TV+ original programming
Documentary television series about music